The 2011–12 Louisiana Tech Bulldogs basketball team represented Louisiana Tech University during the 2011–12 NCAA Division I men's basketball season. The Bulldogs, led by first year head coach Michael White, played their home games at the Thomas Assembly Center and were members of the Western Athletic Conference.

Roster

Schedule

|-
!colspan=9 style=| Exhibition
 
|-
!colspan=9 style=| Regular season
 
 
 
 
 

|-
!colspan=9 style=| WAC tournament

References

External links
2011–12 Louisiana Tech Bulldogs basketball media guide

Louisiana Tech Bulldogs basketball seasons
Louisiana Tech
Louis
Louis